Mohammad Mansouri Fahim (born 26 October 1983) is an Iranian football midfielder who plays for Padideh Shandiz in Azadegan League on loan from Zob Ahan.

Club career

He spent several seasons in Aboumoslem, moved to Persepolis in summer 2008, and was used as a substitute during his first season.

Club career statistics

 Assist Goals

International career
He was called up for Team melli by Amir Ghalenoei in 2007 but never played any match. He also was invited in June 2011 by Carlos Queiroz.

Honours
Hazfi Cup
Winner: 2
2009–10 with Persepolis
2010–11 with Persepolis

References

External links 
 Mohammad Mansouri at PersianLeague.com

1983 births
Living people
Iranian footballers
F.C. Aboomoslem players
Persepolis F.C. players
Shahr Khodro F.C. players
Association football wingers